St. Anne Community High School (District #302) is a public high school in St. Anne Township, Kankakee County, Illinois. It serves rural communities in both Kankakee and Iroquois Counties.

References

Public high schools in Illinois
Schools in Kankakee County, Illinois